Third All-Ukrainian Congress of Soviets was a congress of  Soviets (councils) of workers, peasants, Red-army-men deputies that took place in Kharkiv on March 6 - 10, 1919. The congress followed the Third Congress of the Communist Party of Ukraine that took place on March 1 - 6, 1919.

It was the first congress after the first reoccupation of Ukraine by Soviets. According to declaration of the Provisional Workers' and Peasants' Government of Ukraine of 28 January 1919, the congress had to be summoned no later than March 1, 1919.

Composition
There were 1,787 delegates out which 1,719 had a ruling vote.

Agenda
 Report of the Provisional Workers' and Peasants' Government of Ukraine
 Military issue
 Food supply issue
 Land property issue
 About a draft of the First Constitution of the Ukrainian SSR

Decisions
The congress approved the Provisional Workers-Peasants government of Ukraine and decided to reorganize it into Workers-Peasants government of Ukraine (see Council of People's Commissars). The government included 14 people's commissariats (later on 14 March 1919 it increased to 17).

The congress set a task to establish a regular Red Army, adopted text of a military oath, approved the activity of People's Commissariat of Food Supply, decided to introduce in Ukraine a policy of military communism, adopted "Provisions on socialist land management and about measures of transition to socialist land cultivation".

At the congress was approved the First Constitution of Soviet Ukraine.

According to the new constitution, the congress elected 99 members to the Central Executive Committee and 27 candidates.

See also
 First Rakovsky Government

References

External links
Third All-Ukrainian Congress of Soviets at Ukrainian Soviet Encyclopedia
Boiko, O. The Third all-Ukrainian Congress of Soviets (1919) (ТРЕТІЙ ВСЕУКРАЇНСЬКИЙ З'ЇЗД РАД (1919)). Encyclopedia of History of Ukraine.

Russian Revolution in Ukraine
3
Political history of Ukraine
1919 in Ukraine
History of Kharkiv
1919 in politics
Communism in Ukraine
1919 conferences